George Arthur Clinton (1850–1913) was a British clarinettist. He was a member of Queen Victoria's private ensemble beginning at age 17. He was the principal clarinettist for the Philharmonic Society and The Crystal Palace, and taught at the Royal Academy of Music and several universities.

His family included several notable clarinettists. His father Arthur was a bandleader and clarinettist. His brother James created a "combination" clarinet. His pupils included the composer Sam Hartley Braithwaite.

References

1850 births
1913 deaths
British clarinetists